The DirecTV Classic was an eight-team college basketball tournament held during Thanksgiving week at the Anaheim Convention Center in Anaheim, California. The tournament began in 2007, and was owned and operated by ESPN Regional Television.  Games were televised on ESPN2 and ESPNU.  Until 2012, it was known as the "76 Classic"; ConocoPhillips's 76 chain owned the naming rights to the tournament. DirecTV sponsored the 2012 tournament.  In 2013, the event merged with the Wooden Classic to form a new event, the Wooden Legacy.

Yearly champions, runners-up, and MVPs

* – On January 3, 2010, USC announced it would punish the Men's Basketball Program for rules violations committed in the 2007–2008 season, when O. J. Mayo received improper benefits in violation of NCAA rules all wins during the 2007–2008 season, including any wins during the Pac-10 Conference Tournament, were vacated

All Tournament Teams

2007
 O. J. Mayo, USC - Tournament MVP
 Randal Falker, Southern Illinois
 Michael Bramos, Miami (Ohio)
 Tim Pollitz, Miami (Ohio)
 Jamont Gordon, Mississippi State

2008
 James Harden, Arizona State - Tournament MVP
 Jeff Teague, Wake Forest
 Curtis Jerrells, Baylor
 Patrick Mills, Saint Mary’s
 Stefon Jackson, UTEP

2009
 Da'Sean Butler, West Virginia - Tournament MVP
 Kevin Jones, West Virginia
 Gordon Hayward, Butler
 T.J. Robinson, Long Beach State
 T. J. Campbell, Portland

2010
 Chace Stanback, UNLV - Tournament MVP
 Malcolm Delaney, Virginia Tech
 Marshall Moses, Oklahoma State
 Justin Hurtt, Tulsa
 Lenny Daniel, Cal State Northridge

2011
 Brian Conklin, Saint Louis - Tournament MVP
 Kwamain Mitchell, Saint Louis
 Steven Pledger, Oklahoma
 Evan Roquemore, Santa Clara
 Maalik Wayns, Villanova

Brackets 
* – Denotes overtime period

2012

2011

2010

2009

2008

2007

References 

2007 establishments in California
2012 disestablishments in California
Basketball competitions in Anaheim, California
College sports tournaments in California
College men's basketball competitions in the United States
College basketball competitions
Recurring sporting events established in 2007
Recurring sporting events disestablished in 2012